A number of Italian castles (or ) are associated with the Borgia family of Pope Alexander VI including:

Castello Borgia in Nepi
Rocca di Borgia in Camerino 
The Rocca Abbaziale, also referred to as the Rocca dei Borgia.

See also

List of castles in Italy